Christian Jones may refer to:

 Christian Jones (American football) (born 1991), American football linebacker 
 Christian Jones (racing driver) (born 1979), Australian racing driver